"Andromeda" is a song by Italian singer Elodie. It was written by Dardust and Mahmood and produced by Dardust.

It was released by Universal Music Group and Island Records on 5 February 2020 as the seventh single from the third studio album This Is Elodie. The song was Elodie's entry for the Sanremo Music Festival 2020, the 70th edition of Italy's musical festival which doubles also as a selection of the act for Eurovision Song Contest, where it placed 7th in the grand final. "Andromeda" peaked at number 6 on the Italian FIMI Singles Chart and was certified platinum in Italy.

Background
In "Andromeda", Elodie talks about a relationship with a man older than her, but still unable to take on a serious relationship. The title refers to the constellation of the same name, closely linked to Greek mythology. OptiMagazine described the song's chorus as "exquisitely catchy", praising its production. Billboard Italia described it as "one of the most modern and structurally complex songs" of the Sanremo 2020 Festival. On 9 April 2020, an EP was released containing two remixes of the song in collaboration with Madame and Merk & Kremont.

Music video
The music video for the song, directed by Attilio Cusani, was released on YouTube on 5 February 2020.

Track listing

Charts

Weekly charts

Year-end charts

Certifications

References

2020 singles
2020 songs
Elodie (singer) songs
Sanremo Music Festival songs
Songs written by Mahmood
Songs written by Dario Faini